Paul Shinichi Itonaga (July 23, 1928 – December 10, 2016) was a Roman Catholic bishop.

Ordained to the priesthood in 1952, Itonaga served as bishop of the Roman Catholic Diocese of Kagoshima, Japan, from 1969 to 2005.

Notes

1928 births
2016 deaths
20th-century Roman Catholic bishops in Japan
21st-century Roman Catholic bishops in Japan
Japanese Roman Catholic bishops